Trevor Spracklin (born December 17, 1977) is an American former professional tennis player.

Spracklin turned professional in 2002 after a collegiate career at William & Mary, where he accumulated the most wins of any player in the program's history. He was the Colonial Athletic Association Player of the Year in 1999.

On the ATP Tour, Spracklin made his only singles main draw appearance as a wildcard for the 2002 Legg Mason Tennis Classic and was beaten in the first round by qualifier Kevin Kim. He reached his career best singles world ranking of 734 in 2003. As a doubles player he was ranked as high as 319 in the world and won six ITF Futures titles.

ITF Futures titles

Doubles: (6)

References

External links
 
 

1977 births
Living people
American male tennis players
William & Mary Tribe men's tennis players
20th-century American people
21st-century American people